Hadrocodium wui is an extinct mammaliaform that lived during the Sinemurian stage of the Early Jurassic approximately  in the Lufeng Formation of the Lufeng Basin in what is now the Yunnan province in south-western China
(paleocoordinates ). It is considered as the closest relative of the class Mammalia.

The fossil of this mouse-like, paper-clip sized animal was discovered in 1985 but was then interpreted as a juvenile morganucodontid.

The name Hadrocodium alludes to its large cranial cavity, deriving from the Greek word  ( 'large, heavy, fullness') and the Latin word , from Greek  ( 'head [of a plant]'). The species name, wui, is the Latinized version of discoverer Xiao-Chun Wu's name.

Features
Hadrocodium might have been the first animal to have a nearly fully mammalian middle ear. It is the earliest known example of several features possessed only by mammals, including the middle-ear structure characteristic of modern mammals and a relatively large brain cavity. These features had been considered limited to the crown group mammals, which emerged in the Middle Jurassic; the discovery of Hadrocodium suggests that these attributes appeared 45 million years earlier than previously thought.

Whether Hadrocodium was warm-blooded or cold-blooded has not been settled, although its apparent nocturnal features would seem to place it in the former group.

Hadrocodium were capable of laying eggs like today's platypus and echidna.

Family Tree

Phylogeny

See also 
 Smallest organisms
 Evolution of mammalian auditory ossicles

References

Bibliography 

 
 
 
 
 
  (Supporting online material)

External links

  — 3D models from CT scans of the original fossil
 Palaeocritti - a guide to prehistoric animals

Prehistoric mammaliaforms
Prehistoric cynodont genera
Sinemurian life
Jurassic animals of Asia
Jurassic China
Fossils of China
Paleontology in Yunnan
Fossil taxa described in 2001
Taxa named by Zhe-Xi Luo
Taxa named by Alfred W. Crompton
Taxa named by Ai-Lin Sun